Rådmansgatan is a street in the districts of Östermalm and Vasastaden in the inner city of Stockholm, Sweden.

The Rådmansgatan metro station is located at the intersection of Rådmansgatan with Sveavägen.

Streets in Stockholm